Poyarkovo is the name of several rural localities in Russia:
Poyarkovo, Amur Oblast, a selo in Poyarkovsky Rural Settlement of Mikhaylovsky District of Amur Oblast
Poyarkovo, Kostroma Oblast, a village in Palkinskoye Settlement of Antropovsky District of Kostroma Oblast
Poyarkovo, Moscow Oblast, a village in Lunevskoye Rural Settlement of Solnechnogorsky District of Moscow Oblast
Poyarkovo, Pskov Oblast, a village in Pytalovsky District of Pskov Oblast
Poyarkovo, Ryazan Oblast, a village in Poyarkovsky Rural Okrug of Mikhaylovsky District of Ryazan Oblast